"Principles of Lust" is a 1991 song created by musical project Enigma. It was released as the third single from their debut album, MCMXC a.D. (1990). On the album, "Principles of Lust" is a multi-part song consisting of two versions of "Sadeness" with "Find Love" in between. The single version is a remix of "Find Love" with some additional instrumentation.

Critical reception
Pan-European magazine Music & Media wrote, "The church choir hit-team changes the tempo way down low. Combined with Sandra's vocals and sighs plus some strange bubbling sounds, it should work wonders again."

Track listing
 CD single, UK
 "Principles of Lust" (Radio Edit) – 3:25
 "Principles of Lust" (Omen Mix) – 5:52
 "Principles of Lust" (Jazz Mix) – 3:06
 "Sadeness (Radio Edit)" – 4:17

 CD single, US
 "Principles of Lust" (Radio Edit) – 3:25
 "Principles of Lust" (Everlasting Lust Mix) – 5:09
 "Principles of Lust" (Album Version) – 4:20
 "Principles of Lust" (Jazz Mix) – 3:06

 CD single, Japan
 "Principles of Lust" (Radio Edit) – 3:25
 "Principles of Lust" (Everlasting Lust Mix) – 5:09
 "Principles of Lust" (The Omen Mix) – 5:52
 "Sadeness" (Meditation Mix) – 3:04

Charts

References

Enigma (German band) songs
1991 singles
Songs written by Michael Cretu
1990 songs
Virgin Records singles
Music videos directed by Howard Greenhalgh